The Day of the Macedonian Revolutionary Struggle is a national holiday which is celebrated on October 23rd in North Macedonia. In 2007 the holiday was voted into law as a new national holiday. It is a non-working day.

Historical background 
The holiday is celebrated on the occasion of the formation of the Internal Macedonian Revolutionary Organization in Thessaloniki. On October 23, 1893 six young men gathered at the home of the bookstore owner Ivan Hadži Nikolov in Thessaloniki in order to form the basis which would later become the symbol and flag for the struggle for Macedonian freedom. The founders were: 

 Hristo Tatarčev
 Dame Gruev
 Petar Pop Arsov
 Ivan Hadži Nikolov
 Andon Dimitrov
 Hristo Batandžiev

They formed a covert group, calling it the Macedonian Revolotionary Organization

The organization fought for the freedom of Macedonia without foreign help. The formation of the Macedonian Revolutionary Organization was the beginning of an organized Macedonian revolutionary movement which, via the Ilinden–Preobrazhenie Uprising the Kruševo Republic and, later, World War II in Yugoslav Macedonia, resulted in the creation of the modern independent Macedonian state. This date, October 23, is connected with the organized struggle of the peoples living in Macedonia to create an independent state.

Controversy 
Because this day is considered the beginning of IMRO, the Macedonian public was somewhat reserved in declaring this day a national holiday. The Macedonian opposition at the time, led by Social Democratic Union of Macedonia, were wholly against the declaration because the opposition considered it the birthday of the right-wing party VMRO-DPMNE. As such, it was considered inappropriate to celebrate it as a national holiday. Some Macedonian public figures espoused the view, this celebration is related to the ideas of the Bulgarian nationalism.

In Bulgaria are also some objections against this way of celebration. It appears that IMRO have originally been called "Bulgarian Macedonian-Adrianople Revolutionary Committees". IMRO was active not only in Macedonia but also in Thrace and  initially the membership in the organization was restricted only for Bulgarians. Contrary to the impression of Macedonian researchers who believe that the Internal organization espoused "Macedonian national consciousness," the local revolutionaries during Ottoman times declared their belief, that the majority of the Slavic Christian population of Macedonia was "Bulgarian."  The modern Macedonian historiographic claim of close relationship between the IMRO demands for autonomy with the creation of a separate ethnic Macedonian state, does not correspond with historical records. In this relation, the Bulgarian side has made several proposals that some shared historical events (e.g. the foundation of IMRO) could be celebrated jointly.

Celebration 
In many different parts of North Macedonia the holiday is celebrated with various festivities, concerts, and sports competitions. The official festival is held in the Macedonian Opera and Ballet,  where major national figures and historians from the Macedonian Academy of Sciences and Arts give speeches.

See also 
Public holidays in North Macedonia

References 

History of North Macedonia
National holidays